Panipat Thermal Power Station II is located at Panipat in Haryana. The power plant is one of the coal based power plants of HPGCL

Power plant
The first four units was bifurcated from the total 8 units of the plant, so that to form Panipat Thermal Power Station I and II. Panipat Thermal Power Station II has an installed capacity of 920 MW. This plant was developed under 4 stages.

Installed capacity

See also 

 Panipat Thermal Power Station I

References 

Coal-fired power stations in Haryana
Panipat district
1989 establishments in Haryana
Energy infrastructure completed in 1989
20th-century architecture in India